Cineni is an Afro-Asiatic language spoken in Borno State, Nigeria in the single village of Cineni.  In a 2006 paper, Roger Blench classified it as a dialect of Guduf-Gava.

Notes

Biu-Mandara languages
Languages of Nigeria